FECRIS (Fédération Européenne des Centres de Recherche et d'Information sur le Sectarisme) –  European Federation of Centres of Research and Information on Sectarianism, a French non-profit association and anti-cult organization, serves as an umbrella organization for groups which investigate the activities of groups considered cults in Europe.

History
FECRIS was formed as a French non-profit association, founded in Paris on 30 June 1994 at the request of the French anti-sect association UNADFI (National Union of Associations for the Defence of Family and the Individual), after the 1993 Congress on Sectarianism in Barcelona. FECRIS serves as an umbrella organization for groups which investigate the activities of groups they consider cults in Europe, and it describes itself as "politically, philosophically and religiously neutral". The first president of FECRIS was Dr. Jacques Richard, succeeded by Friedrich Griess. The organization began in 1994 with representation from 10 different countries in Europe. The group's first meeting was held in Paris in October 1994. Its second meeting in April 1995 was attended by individuals from six different countries. At the meeting, the organization decided to focus on research, and stated "the legal aspects of family/cult relationships should be the first subject for research by an appropriate university or professional department".

At a meeting held in Germany in 1996, the organization recommended perusing recent court decisions for information that could be of use to individuals involved in groups researched by FECRIS. By 1999, FECRIS had established a website, located at www.fecris.org. The organization's president, Jean Nokin, traveled with the vice president to a meeting of the American Family Foundation (now the International Cultic Studies Association) in April 2000, where they presented on the topic of "Cults and the Millennium". By May 2001, FECRIS had 36 member organizations in 24 different countries. A June 2001 meeting in Paris dealt with the impact of membership in controversial religious groups, issues of litigation against cults, and safety of youth involved in such groups. The organization held a May 2002 meeting in Barcelona on the topic of "Children and Cults".

As of 2003 the government of France provided funding to the organization. In March 2005, the Council of Europe's Standing Committee of the Parliamentary Assembly granted FECRIS advisory status. In 2009, FECRIS was granted "ECOSOC Special Consultative Status" by the United Nations.

Analysis
FECRIS is described in the 2006 book Non-State Actors in the Human Rights Universe as "a transnational network of (state agencies created to deal with the 'cult issue') anti-cult associations". The A to Z of New Religious Movements by George D. Chryssides places FECRIS within the genre of the anti-cult movement. Paul A. Marshall writes in Religious Freedom in the World that many cult-awareness groups (CAGs) that investigate new religious movements belong to FECRIS. Writing in Multireligiosität im vereinten Europa, Eileen Barker comments that "FECRIS was founded to encompass a number of anti-cult groups." The organization is described in the 2004 book New Religions: A Guide: New Religious Movements, Sects and Alternative Spiritualities: "In France, the principal anti-cult group is UNADFI (National Association for the Defence of the Family International). FECRIS (European Federation of Centres for Research and Sectarianism), founded in 1994, covers Europe more widely, having representatives from ten different European countries."

Criticism 
A 2012 special issue of Religion – Staat – Gesellschaft: Zeitschrift für Glaubensformen und Weltanschauungen ("Journal for the Study of Beliefs and Worldviews") was devoted to a case study of FECRIS; under the heading "Freedom of Religion or Belief: Anti-Sect Movements and State Neutrality" it collected six essays and a conclusion (by Willy Fautré, member of the International Consortium for Law and Religion Studies). Five of the essays discussed the activities of FECRIS in various countries (France, Russia, Austria, Germany, and Serbia). According to Regis Dericquebourg FECRIS pathologizes and criminalizes members of religious minorities, and falsely assigns "sect" status to religious minorities.

In 2014 participant organization of European Fundamental Rights Platform, the European Coordination of Associations and Individuals for Freedom of Conscience created report about how FECRIS describes itself and what its representatives really say and do. Concluded, that "activities of FECRIS constitute a contravention of the principles of respect and tolerance of beliefs" and "it is in direct opposition to the principles of the European Convention on Human Rights and other international human rights instruments".

According to attorney at law Patricia Duval, analysis of FECRIS activities shows that anti-sect affiliates in France characterize any minority religious or spiritual movement as "sectarian", consider conversion to them as "infridgement of human dignity", collect negative messages from family members who disagree with conversion, compile files based on unverified rumors used later to stigmatize movements, and receive financial support from French public institutions, placing in doubt the French government's neutrality regarding religious freedom.

In his conclusion Willy Fautré notes that FECRIS has remarkable associates in the various European countries: though they are founded on French secularism, they are associated in Russia with hard-line Orthodox clergy, and in Austria and Germany with the Catholic and Lutheran churches, "which desperately try to slow down the erosion of their membership and to keep their dominant position in society". The research proved, according to Fautré, that FECRIS and its associates deny freedom of religion, pressure parents of converts to new religious movements and impede the freedom to organize by such organizations, discriminate against new religious movements and stigmatize them through the media, spread rumors and lies, and focus only on smaller religious groups, not on larger institutionalized churches.

In 2022, FECRIS's representative in Russia, Archpriest Alexander Novopashin, described Ukrainians as "Satanists." Following this, the secretary of the Security Council of Russia announced that the Russo-Ukrainian War was for the sake of "de-Satanization," describing Jews, among others, as "Satanic" groups that needed to be eradicated. As of December 2022, Novopashin remains affiliated with FECRIS.

FECRIS has been strongly criticized for its support of its Russian associations and their longstanding involvement in anti-Ukrainian propaganda. Russian associations, and the Russian FECRIS activist Alexander Dvorkin, who was its vice-president from 2009 to 2021, and who in 2022 was still part of its board of directors, distinguished themselves by working together with the Kremlin and the Russian Orthodox Church to justify Russia's war in Ukraine, attribute its cause to Western sectarian movements (Baptists, Pentecostal Christians, Scientologists, Greek Catholics and Neo-Pagans), and denounce anti-war dissidents to the Russian authorities.

After these criticisms were formulated in the press, FECRIS published on its website a message of support for the Ukrainians, erased any reference to its Russian associations on the site, without however denying them publicly or ruling on the membership of Alexander Dvorkin to his Board of Directors.

Notable representatives 
 Tom Sackville – Vice-President of FECRIS (2005) and President of FECRIS (2009-2015)
 Alexander Dvorkin – Vice-President of FECRIS since 2009
 Luigi Corvaglia - Member of the Administrative Board (since 2016) and of the Scientific Committee (since 2015)
 Janja Lalich - Member of the Scientific Committee since 2015

References

External links
 Official site
 About FECRIS
 LIBERO CREDO
 Human Rights Without Frontiers International

Anti-cult organizations
Sectarianism
Government opposition to new religious movements